Encore Data Products is a privately held American manufacturer and supplier of high end audio and video equipment including headphones, amplifiers. The company was founded in 2006 and currently headquartered in Lafayette, Colorado. It is one of the largest manufacturers and supplier of audio and video components in Colorado.

Overview
Encore Data Products was founded in 2006 in Louisville, Colorado by Jeff Burgess. The company target markets are education, health and fitness, hospitality, business and government industries. Encore Data Products is also the sole distributor of the Soundnetic brand of headphones, headsets and earbuds. The company’s products enable schools to incorporate audiovisual resources into their lessons, helping students build speaking and listening skills. Certain headphone and headset requirements need to be met for school district and state testing criteria in the United States.

Products 
Encore Data Products manufacturers their own brand of headphones and headsets, is an exclusive distributor of the Soundnetic brand, and also distributes products from Hamilton-Buhl, Califone, AVID, and others. 
 Headphones – Stereo headphones, over-ear headphones, on-ear headphones, earbuds, wireless headphones, headphones for school testing, headphone amplifiers, TRRS headphones, USB headphones, noise-canceling headphone, disposable headphones and earbuds and bulk headphones;
 Headsets – school testing headsets, gaming headsets, special education headsets, podcasting and streaming headsets, multimedia headsets, disposable headsets and accessories, tour group and language interpretation systems, listening centers;
 Audio Visual Accessories –Chromebook and iPad cases, recorders and media players, portable PA systems and microphones, charging carts and cabinets, AV carts, keyboards and mice, adapters, cases, cables, and extension cords such as the Slim-Straight Headphone Adapter for bulky cases.;
 Presentation Equipment – webcams, document cameras, microscope cameras, podcasting and streaming equipment and multimedia headsets;
 Classroom Hygiene Products –  disinfecting wipes and dispensers, hand and equipment wipes, headphone covers, microphone covers, electronic sanitizers and sanitizing gel.;

References

American brands
Audio equipment manufacturers of the United States
Companies based in Colorado
Lafayette, Colorado
Headphones